Gebek Kala is a mountain peak in the Kazbek district of Dagestan, with an elevation of  above sea level.

The name of a Chechen translated as "strengthening (castle) Gebek".

In the area of Mount Gebek Kala was the last battle of the Chechens and who came to their aid with Laks Mongol troops.

Notes

References

Mountains of Dagestan